Mohamed Ali Kurtuluş (born 29 August 1974) is a Belgian retired footballer who is last known to have played as a midfielder or attacker for Adanaspor.

Career

Ali Kurtuluş started his career with Belgian top flight side AA Gent, where he made 12 league appearances and scored 0 goals. On 28 October 1993, Ali Kurtuluş debuted for AA Gent during a 0-0 draw with Standard. Before the second half of 1997-98, he signed for Sakaryaspor in the Turkish second division, helping them achieve promotion to the Turkish top flight. In 1999, he signed for Turkish top flight club Denizlispor. In 2000, Ali Kurtuluş returned to Turkish second division club Sakaryaspor. 

In 2007, he signed for Sivasspor in the Turkish top flight, helping them achieve 2nd place, where he said, "There are a few places where alcohol is sold in the city, but the trainer knows the owners of those bars. If a player goes out or drink, the coach is informed in no time. The dullness of the city contributes to the success of the club. The players always troops together at the club and such a major togetherness is created." Before the second half of 2009-10, Ali Kurtuluş signed for Turkish second division team Adanaspor.

References

External links

 
 

Living people
1974 births

Belgian footballers
Belgian expatriate footballers
Belgian expatriate sportspeople in Turkey
Expatriate footballers in Turkey
Belgian people of Turkish descent
K.A.A. Gent players
Belgian Pro League players
Süper Lig players
Association football forwards
Association football midfielders
TFF First League players
Footballers from Ghent
Denizlispor footballers
Sivasspor footballers
Sakaryaspor footballers
Çaykur Rizespor footballers
Diyarbakırspor footballers
Adanaspor footballers